Taiwan Journal is an English-language weekly newspaper published by the Government Information Office of the Republic of China (Taiwan). The newspaper, with both print and online editions, is published every Friday, 51 issues per year (no publication during the lunar new year week), with National Day and occasional special editions.

Instead of weekly postings, the new site includes daily updates of 12 political, economic, social and cultural news stories Monday through Friday (“In the News”); photos of the day (“Snapshots”); as well as weekly opinion pieces and features offering analyses and reports on current affairs (“Opinion” and “Features”).

History of the newspaper
Founded as the Free China Weekly—as opposed to the communist Chinese mainland—on March 1, 1964, the newspaper was renamed the Free China Journal on January 1, 1984, Taipei Journal on January 7, 2000, and changed to its present name in March 2003. The newspaper was changed, for a period of time, to a semi–weekly format, from July 4, 1988 to June 18, 1993.

Content of the newspaper
The eight-page newspaper, publishing an average of 15 articles weekly, covers Taiwan-related international news, national news, and economic news. It also features an editorial, opinion and political cartoon page, a critical issues page, as well as society, arts and culture, and industry pages. The newspaper offers accounts on national policies, and the government’s stance on national and international affairs.

Readership
Taiwan Journal is published simultaneously in Taipei and Los Angeles once each week. With a circulation of 16,000 print copies, this newspaper reaches to more than 160 countries and territories around the globe, including some 5,000 copies in the United States alone. The newspaper’s audience includes members of the mass media, government institutions, political circles, academic research institutes, university libraries, and the business sector.

See also
 Taiwan Review
 NOTICIAS
 Taiwan aujourd'hui
 Taiwan Info
 Taiwan Hoy
 Taiwan heute
 Taiwan Panorama
 Taiwan Review (Russian)
 Radio Taiwan International

References

External links
 Taiwan Today

English-language newspapers published in Taiwan
1964 establishments in Taiwan
State media
Propaganda in Taiwan